Terrigal is a coastal town in the Central Coast of New South Wales, Australia, located  east of Gosford on the Pacific Ocean. It is part of the  local government area.

History

Terrigal was first settled in 1826 by European Settler John Gray, who called his property Tarrygal, after the indigenous Aboriginal place name, signifying 'place of little birds'.

Geography and climate

The town's long beach is highly popular with tourists with a large Crowne Plaza hotel. Of geographical significance are the Terrigal lagoons. There are in fact two lagoons at Terrigal, one of which has been filled in to make way for a traffic oval. A local landmark is "The Skillion", a promontory which provides a view of all Terrigal. In recent years the Skillion has undergone rehabilitation by the local city council. Other popular attractions are the numerous nearby surf schools and trails.

The Skillion is on a preserved area of land known as "The Haven". The Haven is centred by a popular public oval which is home of the "Terrigal Trojans", a Rugby Union club. Their new club house was provided by the former Gosford City Council. During the summer it is used by the Terrigal Matcham Cricket Club for both senior and junior fixtures. The Haven also has a popular boat ramp which is partnered by a diving club, and a small number of restaurants and cafes (due to tight development restrictions on the area).

Gosford City Council has invested Terrigal's CBD with a multi-level car park, esplanade walkway and stormwater drainage system. As a result of improved infrastructure and increased developer interest, Terrigal has become substantially more urban since the 1970s, when there was only one market, one medical centre and several orchards in the area.

Terrigal's growth as a tourist destination and investment opportunity for wealthy individuals, such as holiday homes and small businesses, has had both positive and negative effects on the area.

Terrigal, as a popular beach-destination, is generally relatively mild to warm all year round, although can become somewhat cool during the winter months.

Landmarks
Terrigal is home to a number of both natural and man-made landmarks. The Skillion is a sedimentary rock formation which was formed in the Triassic Period. Not only is the Skillion a beautiful artifact, the flip-side features an extremely steep hill which is used for exercise by locals and tourists.

The Terrigal Boardwalk was opened on the 14th April 2021, and was commissioned by the Central Coast Council and partially funded by the NSW Government, to much controversy. The boardwalk provides a link between the Terrigal Beach, the rockpools, boatramp, and The Skillion.

The Twyst Terrigal is a well-known roundabout at the intersection of Terrigal Drive and Oceanview Drive, one of the main travel routes into the town. There has been debate over the need for upgrades along this route, with traffic lights proposed by local MPs, however locals and tourists do not believe that the historical Twyst should be replaced by traffic lights.

Amenities
Just outside the CBD lie a number of amenities: a recently re-built hotel (2006), a primary school and high school (separate campuses), Catholic school, basketball stadium (used for training by Olympic athletes in the 2000 Sydney Olympics), and a large multi-purpose oval with three fields and year-round sporting activities. There have been calls for construction of a skate bowl park at the beach, similar to those at other surf beaches such as those at Bondi and Maroubra, to allow the many local skaters who currently use the esplanade and the space between the surf life saving club and the beach side car park. Recent development of high quality skate bowls at beach-side locations including nearby Copacabana Beach, Bar Beach, Port Macquarie, Cairns, and Cronulla (in advanced planning at the time of writing) have lent weight to the case for skate facilities at Terrigal.

In April 2011, HMAS Adelaide was scuttled off Terrigal as a dive wreck.

Transport
Not far from the town centre are large shopping centres and M1 freeway linked to Sydney (south) and Newcastle (north). The town itself is served by Terrigal Drive (to the west), Scenic Highway (to the south) and Ocean View Drive to the north.

Terrigal is served by Busways routes 67 and 68 to Gosford station.

Gallery

References

Suburbs of the Central Coast (New South Wales)
Surfing locations in New South Wales